Andrew Sousa (born September 26, 1989) is a former professional soccer player.

Career

College and Amateur
Sousa attended B.M.C. Durfee High School (1978), where he served as team captain during his senior year and played his club soccer for Bayside United, Blackwatch Rhode Island, and Nor'easter.

Sousa began his college soccer career at Limestone College, eventually transferring to Providence College prior to his sophomore season. Ending his career with 8 goals and 8 assists in 3 years for the Friars, Sousa scored the eventual game winner in the Semi-finals of the Big East Tournament. In helping the Friars earn a trip to the Big East Championship, Sousa was selected for the Big East All Tournament Team.

During his college years, Sousa played in the USL Premier Development League for the Rhode Island Stingrays and Forest City London.

Professional
Sousa was drafted in the third round (42nd overall) of the 2011 MLS Supplemental Draft by the New England Revolution. He made his professional debut on May 25, 2011, in New England's 5–0 loss in the 2011 Lamar Hunt U.S. Open Cup to Sporting Kansas City. Sousa went on to make 8 appearances for the reserve team, scoring 2 goals. Sousa was waived by New England on November 23, 2011.

At the start of the 2012/2013 season, Sousa signed with Portuguese Segunda Divisão club CD Operário on August 22, 2012. After playing the first half of the season, Sousa terminated his contract with the Portuguese side on February 1, 2013.

On February 26, 2014, Sousa signed with Icelandic, Úrvalsdeild side Fylkir. During the 2014 Úrvalsdeild campaign, Sousa led Fylkir to a 6th-place finish in the league. He led the team in goals (6) and assists (7) in all competitions, recording three game winning goals. On October 4, 2014, with a Europa League place on the line, Sousa recorded 1 goal and 1 assist in a Man of the Match performance. However, Fylkir fell short of reaching a Europa League spot falling to relegated side Fram Reykjavik 4–3.

References

External links
 
 Providence College bio

1989 births
Living people
Sportspeople from Fall River, Massachusetts
Soccer players from Massachusetts
American soccer players
FC London players
New England Revolution players
Rhode Island Stingrays players
Boston Victory S.C. players
Real Boston Rams players
USL League Two players
New England Revolution draft picks
Providence Friars men's soccer players
Association football midfielders
B.M.C. Durfee High School alumni